Baarish mein deewar is a Pakistani comic-socio-political telefilm created and produced by Azfar Ali in 2008, under the banner of Aag Films.

Cast 

 Mohib Mirza
 Aamina Sheikh
 Asif Khattak

References

Pakistani television films
Urdu-language television shows